Coleophora nubivagella is a moth of the family Coleophoridae. It is found from Germany and Poland to the Pyrenees, Italy, North Macedonia and Romania.

The larvae feed on Anthyllis vulneraria, Anthyllis vulneraria alpestris, Arenaria ciliata, Cerastium alpinum lanatum, Cerastium arvense, Cerastium arvense, Cerastium glandulosum, Dianthus myrtinervius, Dianthus plumarius, Dianthus pyrenaicus, Dryas octopetala, Gypsophila repens, Minuartia austriaca, Minuartia setacea, Primula auricula, Primula minima, Saponaria ocymoides, Silene acaulis, Silene pusilla, Silene saxifraga and Silene vulgaris. Young larvae make a corridor from which the first case is cut. The final case is a tubular silken case with a rough surface and 5-6 darker length lines. The mouth angle is about 30°. Larvae can be found from autumn to June.

References

nubivagella
Moths described in 1849
Moths of Europe